Oberreintalschrofen (Upper Rhine Crag) is a mountain on the border of Bavaria, Germany and Tyrol, Austria. The first recorded ascent was by Hermann von Barth.

   

Mountains of Bavaria
Mountains of Tyrol (state)
Mountains of the Alps